Tadhg mac Muircheartach was the first recorded king of Uí Díarmata, a local kingdom located in what is now north County Galway, Ireland, who died in 971.

Background
Tadhg mac Muircheartach was a member of the Síl Muiredaig dynasty, who ruled as kings of The Connachta in what is now central County Roscommon. By the mid 10th-century they had expanded south-west into the north-east of County Galway. Here a branch of the kindred seized territory and renamed it Uí Díarmata, after its founder, Diarmada Finn mac Tomaltaig, who was in turn a great-grandson of King Indrechtach mac Muiredaig (died 723).

Death and successors
Murchad Glun re Lar mac Flaithbertaigh, King of Ailech and King Cathal mac Tadg of Connacht fought each other at Ceis Corran in 971. Cathal was defeated and killed, along with many of his allies including: Geibheannach, son of Aedh, lord of Ui-Maine; Tadhg, son of Muircheartach, chief of Ui-Diarmada; Murchadh, son of Flann, son of Glethneachan, chief of Clann-Murchadha; and Seirridh Ua Flaithbheartaigh, with a countless number along with them: and Murchadh totally plundered Connaught afterwards.

His son, Concenaind mac Tadhg, though never apparently king himself, would give his name to the ruling dynasty of Uí Díarmata, Ó Cú  Ceanain (anglicised "Concannon")

The Concanon pedigree
Muiredach Muillethan, died 702, father of
Indrechtach mac Muiredaig, died 723, father of
Murgaile mac Indrachtaig, father of
Tomaltaig mac Murgaile.father of
Diarmada Finn mac Tomaltaig, father of
Dadlaich mac Diarmada Finn, father of
Ailill mac Dadlaich, father of
Muircertaig mac Ailill, father of
Tadhg mac Muircertaig, died 971, father of
Cú Ceanain mac Tadhg, died 991, father of
Uata mac Concenaind, died 1021, father of
Tadhg mac Uata, father of
Muircertaig Mir mac Tadhg, father of
Mailechlainn mac Muircertaig, father of
Cathal mac Mailechlainn, father of
Aedh mac Cathail, father of
Tadhg mac Aedh, father of
Ardgal mac Tadhg, fl. mid 12th century?

References

 The Tribes and Customs of Hy-Many, John O'Donovan, 1843
 The Parish of Ballinasloe, Fr. Jerome A. Fahey.
 https://www.webcitation.org/query?url=http://www.geocities.com/Athens/Aegean/2444/irish/LD.htm&date=2009-10-25+05:47:51
 Vol. 2 (AD 903–1171): edition and translation
 Annals of Ulster at CELT: Corpus of Electronic Texts at University College Cork
 Annals of Tigernach at CELT: Corpus of Electronic Texts at University College Cork
Revised edition of McCarthy's synchronisms at Trinity College Dublin.

People from County Galway
971 deaths
10th-century Irish monarchs
Year of birth unknown